Angelo Nardi da Razzo (19 February 1584 – 1664) was an Italian painter of the early Baroque period; active primarily in Spain.

Biography 
He was born in Vaglia to a noble Florentine family that had been dispossessed of their assets and banished by the Medicis. His artistic formation probably took place in a circle of painters that included major figures of the Counter-reformation such as Ludovico Cigoli, Domenico Passignano and Gregorio Pagani.

From approximately 1600 to 1607, he lived in Venice. After that time, he established himself in Madrid. By 1615, he had been commissioned to paint a series of works celebrating a meeting of Spanish and French royalty in Irun. Those paintings were destroyed in a fire at the Royal Alcázar of Madrid in 1734. These are considered to be the first works of his artistic maturity.

Following Aguilera's death in 1620, he took over the studio and, in 1623, married his thirteen-year-old daughter. This is believed to have been a "marriage of convenience" and he had it annulled in 1625. Marcos' son, Lorenzo, filed suit against Nardi, but it was dismissed. Shortly after, he received the largely honorary (unpaid) position of Painter to the King.

The death of Bartolomé González in 1627 left an opening for court painter, which Nardi finally obtained in 1631, despite some very serious competition. Among his competitors was Diego Velázquez, who was awarded a similar post. Over the years, they developed a friendly working relationship. Nardi would act as a character witness in favor of Velázquez when he was being considered for the Order of Santiago. With his economic situation secured, he devoted some time to doing works for religious communities. Later, he would win his fellow painters an exemption from the alcabala; a type of sales tax.

He died in Madrid and was interred at the Church of the Misericordia, which was destroyed during the Spanish Civil War. A street in Vaglia bears his name.

Selected works 

 Crucifixión (Carmelite order, Alcalá de Henares)
 Escenas de la Vida de Santa Teresa de Jesús (Carmelite order)
 Decorations of frescoes at the Chapel of the Conception, La Guardia (c. 1630)
 Noli me tangere (1639, Getafe)
 Escenas de la Vida de la Magdalena (1639, Alcalá de Henares archives) 
 San Jerónimo (Saint Jerome) (Biblioteca Museu Víctor Balaguer)
 San José con el Niño y san Juanito (Museo del Prado)
 Presentación de Jesús en el Templo (Museo de Prado, Huesca)
 Retablo de las Claras (1647, Alcalá de Henares)
 Adoración de los Pastores (Adoration of the Shepherds) (1650, private collection)

Sources 
Antonio Palomino, An account of the lives and works of the most eminent Spanish painters, sculptors and architects, 1724, first English translation, 1739, p. 37
 
Angulo Íñiguez, Diego y Pérez Sánchez, Alfonso, E., Pintura madrileña. Primer tercio del siglo XVII (Madrilene Painters), Madrid, Instituto Diego Velázquez, 1969, p. 271-298.
Pérez Sánchez, Alfonso E., Borgianni, Cavarozzi y Nardi en España (Borgianni, Cavarozzi and Nardi in Spain), Madrid, Instituto Diego Velázquez, CSIC, 1964, p. 25.

External links

 Angelo Nardi on the Museo del Prado Online Encyclopedia 
 Biographic article on Angelo Nardi and its works in Alcalá de Henares
 Rocío Bruquetas, Pinturas de Ángelo Nardi en el Monasterio de San Bernardo de Alcalá de Henares: proyecto de restauración de los cuadros de las capillas laterales de la iglesia.

17th-century Italian painters
Italian male painters
Painters from Florence
17th-century Spanish painters
Spanish male painters
1584 births
1664 deaths